Mikel Scicluna (July 29, 1929 – March 20, 2010) was a Maltese  professional wrestler who gained his fame during the 1960s and 1970s. He reached the peak of his success in WWWF where he was 2-time tag-team champion, having held the United States Tagteam championship once and the WWE World Tagteam Championship once.

Professional wrestling career
Scicluna started wrestling during the 1950s, and used the name Mike Valentino early in his career. Scicluna worked primarily in Canada until 1965, when he ventured to the World Wide Wrestling Federation (WWWF), now known as WWE, using his most famous moniker "Baron" Mikel Scicluna.

Scicluna was famous for entering the ring with a royal blue cape over his shoulders, indicating that he was of Maltese royal descent. Scicluna was also known for being a master of the "foreign object", mainly utilizing a roll of coins to bash opponents out of sight of the referee. He enjoyed success as a tag team wrestler, winning the WWWF United States Tag Team Championship with Smasher Sloan on September 22, 1966, in Washington, D.C. (though they eventually lost the belts in the same city to Spiros Arion and Antonio Pugliese), then the WWWF World Tag Team Championship with King Curtis Iaukea on February 1, 1972, in Philadelphia.

In singles competition, Scicluna defeated Spiros Arion for Australia's IWA World Championship on June 15, 1968, and would challenge Bruno Sammartino and Pedro Morales for the WWWF Championship from time to time. One of his biggest career wins was pinning Waldo Von Erich in six minutes at Madison Square Garden, prior to two Garden title matches with Sammartino. In the first match at MSG against Sammartino he was disqualified; Sammartino scored the pin in a rematch. Scicluna went on to lose a series of matches to Spiros Arion. In June 1976, Scicluna found himself part of history, as the opponent for Gorilla Monsoon on the night Monsoon engaged in an impromptu tussle with boxing great Muhammad Ali. Scicluna was wrestling Monsoon in a televised match and was sent over the top rope to the floor after receiving a Manchurian Chop. Scicluna waved off his opponent and walked off, taking a countout loss. From there, Ali entered the ring from the audience and tried to jab at Monsoon. Monsoon responded by dropping Ali with an airplane spin. This angle was a part of the buildup toward Ali's infamous boxer vs. wrestler match with Antonio Inoki later in the month.

Scicluna retired from active competition in 1983. He was inducted into the WWE Hall of Fame class of 1996.

Personal life
He was the son of Vincenzo Scicluna and Maria (née' Catania) who were married in Mosta, Malta, on 27 August 1927. He was named after his paternal grandfather Michele Scicluna. In retirement, he lived in Pittsburgh, Pennsylvania. He also worked as a driver for the New York Times. He had a wife, Gloria, and one son. Scicluna died March 20, 2010, from pancreatic cancer.

Championships and accomplishments 
NWA San Francisco
NWA World Tag Team Championship (San Francisco version) (3 times) - with Gene Dubuque
World Championship Wrestling
IWA World Heavyweight Championship (1 time)
IWA World Tag Team Championship (3 times) - with Ciclón Negro
World Wide Wrestling Federation
WWF Hall of Fame (Class of 1996)
WWWF United States Tag Team Championship (1 time) - with Smasher Sloan
WWWF World Tag Team Championship (1 time) - with King Curtis Iaukea
Wrestling Observer Newsletter
Most Washed Up Wrestler (1980)

References

External links 
 
 

1929 births
2010 deaths
People from Balzan
People from Pittsburgh
Maltese professional wrestlers
Professional wrestlers from Pennsylvania
WWE Hall of Fame inductees
Deaths from cancer in Pennsylvania
Maltese sportspeople
Stampede Wrestling alumni
20th-century professional wrestlers
IWA World Heavyweight Champions (Australia)
IWA World Tag Team Champions (Australia)